Christopher Winton Beeny (7 July 1941 – 3 January 2020) was an English actor and dancer. He had a career as a child actor, but was best known for his work as the footman Edward Barnes on the 1970s television series Upstairs, Downstairs, as Billy Henshaw  in the sitcom In Loving Memory (Yorkshire Television), and as the incompetent debt collector and golfer Morton Beamish in Last of the Summer Wine.

Early life
Beeny was born in London. He moved to Bristol with his family as a young child, spent several years at the Arts Educational School, and later attended the Royal Academy of Dramatic Art. As a child, Beeny began his career at the age of six when he danced for the Ballet Rambert.

Beeny's first screen role was in the film The Long Memory (1953). It starred John Mills and featured Thora Hird, Beeny's future co-star in In Loving Memory and Last of the Summer Wine.

Television
Beeny played Lenny Grove in the first British television soap, the BBC TV series The Grove Family, which was shown on Fridays from 1954 until 1957, (and named after the BBC Studios of Lime Grove Studios), as well as the feature film of the same, called It's a Great Day.

He gained notice when he appeared in the highly successful period drama Upstairs, Downstairs (1971–75) as the footman Edward Barnes. He appeared as Geoffrey in the single mother sitcom Miss Jones and Son (1977–78), as Tony in the remake of The Rag Trade (1977–78) and  co-starring (as Billy Henshaw) with Thora Hird in a further sitcom, In Loving Memory.

In 2001 he made a guest appearance in Last of the Summer Wine, something which he repeated numerous times until 2009 when he joined the cast as a regular character. He appeared originally as the character Herman Teasdale, who later became Morton Beamish.

In 2006, he played a cameo role in Emmerdale. Coincidentally, he played the cousin of the character Noreen Bell, who had been played by his Upstairs, Downstairs colleague Jenny Tomasin. Beeny also played cameo roles in BBC TV's Sense & Sensibility and ITV's series Honest.

Theatre
Beeny's theatre appearances included Stop the World – I Want to Get Off; The Long The Short And The Tall; Scapino; How the Other Half Loves; Night Must Fall; Oliver!; Who Saw Him Die; The Unexpected Guest; Boeing, Boeing; Move Over, Mrs. Markham; Bedroom Farce; Run For Your Wife; Rough Crossing; Present Laughter; Brief Encounter; Caught In The Net; Crazy For You; Ten Times Table, and Lark Rise to Candleford.

Beeny also toured in the play There's No Place Like a Home with Gorden Kaye, and in 2011 toured in Five Blue Haired Ladies Sitting On A Park Bench. He appeared in pantomime at the Assembly Hall, Tunbridge Wells in late 2011, early 2012.

Beeny's son, James, formed the band Virgin Soldiers in 2009 and co-wrote a production that commemorates the 100th Anniversary of WWI. The production, The Dreamers, premiered at the Assembly Hall Theatre Tunbridge Wells in October 2014, and reached the West End in the summer of 2015. Beeny played the role of The Storyteller in the production.

Personal life
Beeny had two children – a daughter, Johanne and a son, Richard – from his first marriage, and a son, James, from his second marriage to singer Diana Kirkwood, who performed on the BBC's Pebble Mill at One in the 1970s and 1980s.

He died at his home in Kent on 3 January 2020, aged 78.

Filmography

Film

Television

References

External links
 
 Chris Beeny (Aveleyman)

1941 births
2020 deaths
English male child actors
English male film actors
English male stage actors
English male television actors
Male actors from Bristol
Alumni of RADA
People educated at the Arts Educational Schools